This is a list of Cheyney University of Pennsylvania alumni by class year:

Alumni

.

References

Lists of people by university or college in Pennsylvania